Victoria Carl (born 31 July 1995) is a German cross-country skier. She has competed in the World Cup since the 2013 season.

She represented Germany at the FIS Nordic World Ski Championships 2015 in Falun.

Cross-country skiing results
All results are sourced from the International Ski Federation (FIS).

Olympic Games
2 medals (1 gold, 1 silver)

World Championships

World Cup

Season standings

Team podiums
 2 podiums – (2 )

See also
List of Youth Olympic Games gold medalists who won Olympic gold medals

References

External links

1995 births
Living people
People from Zella-Mehlis
Sportspeople from Thuringia
German female cross-country skiers
Tour de Ski skiers
Olympic cross-country skiers of Germany
Cross-country skiers at the 2018 Winter Olympics
Cross-country skiers at the 2022 Winter Olympics
Cross-country skiers at the 2012 Winter Youth Olympics
Youth Olympic gold medalists for Germany
Medalists at the 2022 Winter Olympics
Olympic gold medalists for Germany
Olympic silver medalists for Germany
Olympic medalists in cross-country skiing
21st-century German women